The Chodkiewicz Palace (or, in Lithuanian transliteration, Chodkevičiai Palace) is a building in Old Town of Vilnius  on Didžioji St. Currently it is owned by the Lithuanian Art Museum.

History 
Masonry buildings in the palace site date back to the 16th century. The current palace appearance is from the 19th century (1825-1834), most likely a project of the architect Tomas Tišeckis (Tomasz Tyszecki).

At least eight generations of the Chodkiewicz  family lived in the palace, until it was sold in 1811. Since 1994 it has been owned by the Lithuanian Art Museum and houses a picture gallery, administrative offices, the library, archive and art storage.

References

External links 
 Vilnius Picture Gallery

Palaces in Vilnius